In the mathematical field of differential geometry, the Simons formula (also known as the Simons identity, and in some variants as the Simons inequality) is a fundamental equation in the study of minimal submanifolds. It was discovered by James Simons in 1968. It can be viewed as a formula for the Laplacian of the second fundamental form of a Riemannian submanifold. It is often quoted and used in the less precise form of a formula or inequality for the Laplacian of the length of the second fundamental form.

In the case of a hypersurface  of Euclidean space, the formula asserts that

This has the consequence that

where  is the shape operator. In this setting, the derivation is particularly simple:

the only tools involved are the Codazzi equation (equalities #2 and 4), the Gauss equation (equality #4), and the commutation identity for covariant differentiation (equality #3). The more general case of a hypersurface in a Riemannian manifold requires additional terms to do with the Riemann curvature tensor. In the even more general setting of arbitrary codimension, the formula involves a complicated polynomial in the second fundamental form.

References 
Footnotes

Books

Articles

Differential geometry of surfaces
Riemannian manifolds